Železničarski košarkarski klub Maribor, commonly referred to as ŽKK Maribor or simply ŽKK, was a basketball team based in Maribor, Slovenia. The club was founded in 1946 and was dissolved after the 2005–06 season due to financial difficulties.

History
The club was founded in 1946 as a basketball section of SŠD Železničar. It won its first Slovenian title in 1949 and renamed as ŽKK Maribor in 1954. They played in the Yugoslav First Federal Basketball League the following year, but were relegated with only one win and finished in the last place. In the 1970s, ŽKK also played in the Yugoslav Second League and later renamed as Tima MTT. Under that name they played in the Yugoslav 1. B League from 1985 until 1987. In that year, the club merged with their city rivals KK Branik and formed KK Maribor 87 as a new city team. The latter played in the Yugoslav 1. B League, but after Slovenia's independence in 1991 it disintegrated back to ŽKK and Branik. ŽKK played mostly in the second and third divisions until 2005–06, when the club went bankrupt.

In 2005, the club's youth school KŠ Maribor registered as KK Maribor and started competing as its own club in 2006.

References

External links
Eurobasket profile

Basketball teams established in 1946
Basketball teams in Slovenia
Sport in Maribor
Basketball teams in Yugoslavia
1946 establishments in Slovenia
Basketball teams disestablished in 2006
2006 disestablishments in Slovenia